The Frost Bank Tower is a skyscraper in Austin, Texas, United States. Standing 515 feet (157 m) tall with 33 floors, it is the fifth tallest building in Austin, behind The Independent, The Austonian, Fairmont Austin, and the 360 Condominiums. It was the first high-rise building to be constructed in the United States after the 9/11 attacks. The building was officially dedicated in January 2004.

This advertises the San Antoniobased Frost Bank, whose Austin headquarters and insurance division are in the building. Tenants in the building besides Frost Bank include the Austin offices of Morgan Stanley, Ernst & Young, and PIMCO.
The silvery blue color glass facade was first used on the Reuters Building in New York City.
Cousins sold the building in 2006 to EQ Office for $188 million before the building was sold to Thomas Properties Group the same year. In 2013, ownership of the building transferred to Parkway Properties. The building is currently owned by Endeavor Real Estate Group.

History

In 1998, T.Stacy & Associates consolidated tracts of land at the building site, at the time a vacant lot, and sold it to Cousins Properties in 2001. As the building began construction on November 27, 2001, it became the tallest building in the United States of America to be constructed after the September 11 attacks. Construction was finished about 2 years later in 2003, and the tower was officially dedicated in 2004. It became the tallest building in Austin, Texas, and the fourth tallest building outside of Dallas and Houston, Texas, (excluding the Tower of the Americas in San Antonio). In August 2003 cost of the building was estimated at $137 million.

As of March 2011, it is the 54th tallest building in Texas. In 2006, Cousins Properties sold the building for $188 million to EQ Office, which eventually sold it to Thomas Properties Group. Currently, there are many notable tenants in the building, including Frost Bank, Morgan Stanley, Ernst & Young, PIMCO, UTIMCO, and Heritage Title Co.

Architecture

Designed by Duda/Paine Architects, LLP with HKS, Inc. as the Architect of Record, the Frost Bank Tower is considered one of the most recognizable buildings in Austin. The building starts with a rectangular shape on the ground that eventually becomes a square point in the crown. The base of the building is expressed in honed finish limestone while the main superstructure of the building is a blue low-e glass skin, which is a thicker type of glass, that covers the entire tower. The Frost Bank Tower is one of only two places in the world with blue low-e glass skin, the other being the Reuters Building in New York City, which was the earlier structure. The folded panes of the building step back to create a segmented pyramidal form. Lighting covers the crown, where a section of the building  lights up, and sometimes changes color for special occasions, such as the 2006 Rose Bowl, when the Austin-based University of Texas Longhorns defeated the USC Trojans. More than 200,000 sq ft (60,960 sq m) of glass was used for the facade of the building alone and 45,000 sq ft (13,716 sq m) of glass was used in the crown. The building also contains an 11 level parking garage with spaces for more than 1,400 vehicles.

Critics' responses
The Frost Bank Tower's design received a polarized response upon its completion. Austin American-Statesman columnist John Kelso compared the building's crown to an enormous set of nose hair trimmers. Jeanne Claire van Ryzin, a Statesman art critic, opined that the "jagged form of the crown looks more like a riff on the post-modern ornamentation of the 1980s than any kind of newly inspired form."

Austin Chronicle readers voted the Frost Bank Tower as the "Best New Building (Past Five Years)" in 2004, 2006, 2007, and 2008. It was also voted for best architecture in 2004 and 2005. The newspaper also said that the "owl face of the Frost Bank Tower" helps keep Austin "characteristically weird". The tower was awarded the 2005 International Association of Lighting Designers (IALD) Award of Merit for lighting design by Cline Bettridge Bernstein Lighting Design for its "second set of narrowly focused accent lights that showcase the vertical mullions at the setback near the building top" and "monumental custom sconces that add scale and create a welcoming frame around the opening portals of the lobby". The building also won the 2003 Texas Construction Magazine Award of Merit.

Amenities

The Frost Bank Tower contains a wide variety of amenities. Such amenities in the building include conference facilities, building concierge, 24-hour cardkey access, fully equipped fitness center, state-of-the-art telecommunication systems, tenant controlled HVAC, upscale restaurants, deli/carry-out restaurants, a coffee shop, and a dry-cleaner. Following the builders tradition, a tin Christian cross was embedded into the concrete of each floor during construction, with the last being added on May 27, 2003. The idea came from a story of an immigrant who worked on construction during the 1940s in New York City. Also, a  cedar tree was hoisted to the top of the mechanical penthouse during the topping out ceremony.

Position in Austin's skyline

The building covers most of its block, which is located near the center of downtown at 4th Street and Congress Avenue. Its location in the skyline, matched with its height, excited Austinites and was known as a centerpiece to the skyline.

Gallery

See also

Sixth Street
Downtown Austin
The Austonian
List of tallest buildings in Austin

References

Bank company headquarters in the United States
Office buildings completed in 2004
Skyscraper office buildings in Austin, Texas
2004 establishments in Texas